Lamprogrammus niger is a species of fish in the family Ophidiidae.

References 

Ophidiidae
Fish described in 1891